Lei Line Eon is the second studio album by English electronic music producer Iglooghost, released 2 April 2021 via Gloo.

Reception

Year-end lists

Track listing

References 

2021 albums
Iglooghost albums
UK bass albums
Chamber music albums